The Journal of Dentistry is a bimonthly peer-reviewed medical journal in the field of dentistry. It was established in 1950 as the Dental Practitioner and Dental Record, obtaining its current name in 1972. It is published by Elsevier and the editor-in-chief is Christopher D. Lynch (Cardiff University). According to the Journal Citation Reports, the journal has a 2021 impact factor of 4.991.

References

External links 

Dentistry journals
Publications established in 1950
Elsevier academic journals
Bimonthly journals
English-language journals